Minuscule 254 (in the Gregory-Aland numbering), ΟΘ42 (Soden), is a Greek minuscule manuscript of the New Testament, on paper. Palaeographically it had been assigned to the 11th century. Formerly it was labelled by 251a, 301p, 122r. Scrivener labelled it by 201a, 396p, 86r.
It has marginalia.

Description 

The codex contains the text of the Acts, Catholic epistles, Paul, Book of Revelation on 453 paper leaves, with lacunae at the beginning and end. The text is written in 1 column per page, 42 lines per page. The biblical text is surrounded by a commentary (catena).

It has commentaries of Theophylact and Andreas Caesariensis.

Text 

The Greek text of the codex is a representative of the Alexandrian text-type in the Catholic epistles, and the Byzantine text-type elsewhere. Kurt Aland placed it in Category III in Catholic epistles and in Category V elsewhere.

History 

The manuscript was examined by Matthaei and Hoskier. Hoskier collated the text of the Apocalypse.

C. R. Gregory saw the manuscript in 1886. Formerly it was labelled by 251a, 301p, 122r. In 1908 Gregory gave number 254 for it.

Currently the manuscript is housed at the National Library of Greece (490) in Athens.

See also 

 List of New Testament minuscules
 Biblical manuscript
 Textual criticism

References

Further reading 

 C. F. Matthei, Novum Testamentum Graece et Latine (Riga, 1782-1788). (as 11)
 Herman C. Hoskier, Concerning the Text of the Apocalypse (London 1929), vol. 1, pp. 747–751.

Greek New Testament minuscules
14th-century biblical manuscripts
Manuscripts of the National Library of Greece